Maddison Michelle "Maddie" Bowman (born January 10, 1994) is an American former freestyle skier. She won a silver medal in the superpipe at Winter X Games XVI in 2012.

Bowman won gold at Winter X Games XVII in 2013, 2014, 2015, 2016 & 2018, and a gold medal at the 2014 Winter Olympics in the ski halfpipe. At the 2018 Winter Olympics, she finished in 11th place.

References

External links
 
 
 
 
 
 
 

1994 births
Living people
American female freestyle skiers
Olympic freestyle skiers of the United States
Olympic gold medalists for the United States in freestyle skiing
Olympic medalists in freestyle skiing
Freestyle skiers at the 2014 Winter Olympics
Freestyle skiers at the 2018 Winter Olympics
Medalists at the 2014 Winter Olympics
X Games athletes
People from South Lake Tahoe, California
Sportspeople from California
21st-century American women